Bob Vogel (born March 17, 1951) is an American politician served as a member of the Minnesota House of Representatives for the 20A district from 2015 to 2021.

Education
Vogel earned a Bachelor of Arts degree from University of St. Thomas.

Career 
Vogel served as a member of the Scott County Board of Commissioner from 2002 to 2008, including two years as its chair. He was first elected to the Minnesota House of Representativess in 2014.

Personal life
Vogel is married to his wife, Laura. They have two children and reside in Elko New Market, Minnesota.

References

External links

Rep. Bob Vogel official Minnesota House of Representatives website

1951 births
Living people
Republican Party members of the Minnesota House of Representatives
Businesspeople from Minnesota
University of St. Thomas (Minnesota) alumni
People from Scott County, Minnesota
21st-century American politicians